An election for Members of the European Parliament representing Estonia constituency for the 2004–2009 term of the European Parliament was held on 13 June 2004. It was part of the wider 2004 European election.

The election was conducted using the D'Hondt method with open list. The voter turnout in Estonia was one of the lowest of all member countries at only 26.8%. A similar trend was visible in most of the new member states that joined the EU in 2004.

The biggest winner was the Social Democratic Party, due to the popularity of their leading candidate Toomas Hendrik Ilves, who received the vast majority of the party's votes. The governing Res Publica Party and People's Union polled poorly. Ilves went on to become President of Estonia in October 2006, leaving his MEP seat to Katrin Saks.

Results

References

Estonia
European Parliament elections in Estonia
2004 in Estonia